Hakim Guenouche (born 30 May 2000) is a French professional footballer who plays as a left-back for Austrian club Austria Lustenau.

Club career
In June 2018, Guenouche signed a three-year deal with FC Zürich, leaving youth club AS Nancy. He made his competitive debut for the club on 31 October 2018, playing the full 90 minutes of FC Zürich's 3–2 away victory over Red Star Zürich in the Swiss Cup.

In July 2019, KFC Uerdingen 05 of the 3. Liga announced the signing of Guenouche.

On 14 July 2021, he joined Austria Lustenau in Austria on a two-year contract.

International career
Born in France, Guenouche is of Algerian descent. He is a youth international for France.

Honours
Austria Lustenau
 Austrian Football Second League: 2021–22

References

External links
Profile at ESPN FC

2000 births
Living people
French footballers
Association football defenders
France youth international footballers
French sportspeople of Algerian descent
Swiss Super League players
3. Liga players
2. Liga (Austria) players
FC Zürich players
KFC Uerdingen 05 players
SC Austria Lustenau players
French expatriate footballers
Expatriate footballers in Switzerland
French expatriate sportspeople in Switzerland
Expatriate footballers in Germany
French expatriate sportspeople in Germany
Expatriate footballers in Austria
French expatriate sportspeople in Austria